Laura Greene may refer to:

 Laura Greene (presenter) (born 1972), British weather presenter and television presenter
 Laura Greene (physicist), physics professor at Florida State University

See also
 Laura Green, British epidemiologist and academic